Laram Qullu (Aymara larama blue, qullu mountain, "blue mountain", also spelled Laran Kkollu) is a mountain in the Bolivian Andes which reaches a height of approximately . It is located in the La Paz Department, Loayza Province, Luribay Municipality. Laram Qullu lies northeast of Chuqi Sillani.

References 

Mountains of La Paz Department (Bolivia)